Finn Ó Haughluinn, Irish musician, died 1490.

Ó Haughluinn is described in his obituary in the Annals of the Four Masters as Chief Tympanist of Ireland. No further details of his life are given or are known to survive.

His obit was one of the last of any musician in the Gaelic annals, and apparently the very last reference in classical Irish literature to the An Tiompan Gàidhealach, which was being steadily replaced by the harp.

References
 What was the Tiompán? A problem in ethnohistorical organology. Evidence in Irish literature, Ann Buckley, p. 53–88, Jahrbuch fur Musikalische Volks – un Volkerkunde, ix, 1978.
 Timpán/Tiompán, Ann Buckley, in The New Grove Dictionary of Music and Musicians, London, 1980
 Timpán/Tiompán, Ann Buckley, in The New Grove Dictionary of Musical Instruments, London, 1986
 Musical instruments in Ireland 9th 14th centuries: A review of the organological evidence, Ann Buckley, pp. 13–57, Irish Musical Studies i, Blackrock, County Dublin, 1990
 Music and musicians in medieval Irish society, Ann Buckley, pp. 165–190, Early Music xxviii, no.2, May 2000
 Music in Prehistoric and Medieval Ireland, Ann Buckley, pp. 744–813, in A New History of Ireland, volume one, Oxford, 2005.
 The Annals of Ireland by Friar John Clyn, pp. 95–96, 95–101, 102, 194, edited by Bernadette Williams, Four Courts Press, Dublin, 2007.

External links
 http://www.ucc.ie/celt/published/T100005D/index.html

Year of birth unknown
1490 deaths
Medieval Gaels from Ireland
15th-century Irish musicians
People of the Tudor period
Irish hammered dulcimer players